Rhos Fawr is a mountain summit in the Radnor Forest (Mid Wales), a rather isolated dome of hills to the north of the village of New Radnor. The local rocks are sedimentary shales and mudstones with some Silurian limestone.

The summit is located on a broad heathery plateau, which is separated from Black Mixen: the eastern plateau summit, by the cwm of Harvey Dingle. To the west is Drygarn Fawr and Gorllwyn, to the northwest Plynlimon, to the north Beacon Hill and the Clun Forest (Shropshire), and to the south the Black Mountains.
There is a prominent trig point at the summit, and a very useful landmark for walkers  on the broad and featureless summit plateau.

References

External links
 www.geograph.co.uk : photos of Great Rhos and surrounding area

Radnor Forest
Mountains and hills of Powys
Marilyns of Wales
Hewitts of Wales
Nuttalls
Highest points of Welsh counties